Centro Deportivo Brunete were a football team based in Brunete in the Community of Madrid.

History 
Centro Deportivo Brunete was founded in 1950. The team came to play three seasons at level 5 of Spanish football (Preferente). At end of the 2010–11 season, the club was dissolved due to financial limitations.

Uniform
 Home Kit: Green Shirt, White pants.

Stadium

Centro Deportivo Brunete, home stadium is Los Arcos, which has a capacity of 3,000 spectators.

Season to season

References

External links
Official website

Association football clubs established in 1950
Association football clubs disestablished in 2011
Defunct football clubs in the Community of Madrid
1950 establishments in Spain
2011 disestablishments in Spain